Györgyi Őri (née Győrvári; born October 11, 1955, in Békéscsaba) is a former Hungarian handball player and multiple World Championship medalist.

In 1980 she was a member of the Hungarian team which finished fourth in the Olympic Games. She played in four matches.

References

1955 births
Living people
People from Békéscsaba
Hungarian female handball players
Olympic handball players of Hungary
Handball players at the 1980 Summer Olympics
Sportspeople from Békés County
20th-century Hungarian women